The BTS Silom line or Dark Green line, is an elevated rapid transit line of the BTS Skytrain in Bangkok, Thailand. It is operated by Bangkok Mass Transit System PCL (BTSC), a subsidiary of BTS Group Holdings, under a concession granted by the Bangkok Metropolitan Administration (BMA). The Silom Line which serves Silom and Sathon Roads, the central business district of Bangkok, terminates at National Stadium and Bang Wa. The line is 14.67 km in length and consists of 14 stations.

Route Alignment
It runs eastward from the National Stadium Station in Pathum Wan District over Rama I Road and interchanges with the Sukhumvit line at Siam BTS station, then turns southward, following Ratchadamri, Si Lom, Narathiwat Ratchanakharin and Sathon Roads to Taksin Bridge where it crosses the Chao Phraya River to the Thonburi side of Bangkok and Wong Wian Yai. It continues west along the Ratchapruek rd corridor before it terminates at Bang Wa Station in Phasi Charoen District.

History
Originally consisting of seven stations from National Stadium (W1) to Saphan Taksin (S6) when the BTS first opened 5 December 1999. A planned station at S4 was not built originally but was completed in 2021. Its formal name is The Elevated Train in Commemoration of HM the King's 6th Cycle Birthday 2nd line. A 2.2 km extension across the river to Wongwian Yai (S8) opened on 15 May 2009 after two years of delay. A further 5.3 km, 4 station extension from Wongwian Yai (S8) to Bang Wa (S12) opened on 5 December 2013 after delays caused by the Bangkok floods of late 2011.

Extensions and current construction
Summary of BTS Silom line Extensions:
 5 December 1999: National Stadium (W01) – Saphan Taksin (S06)
 15 May 2009: Saphan Taksin (S06) – Wong Wian Yai (S08)
 12 January 2013: Wong Wian Yai (S08) – Pho Nimit (S09) 
 14 February 2013: Pho Nimit (S09) – Talat Phlu (S10)
 5 December 2013: Talat Phlu (S10) – Bang Wa (S12)
8 February 2021: Saint Louis (S4, infill station)

1st extension to Wong Wian Yai
On 18 October 2005, with no approval from the central government forthcoming, Bangkok Metropolitan Administration (BMA) decided to fund and complete the  Silom Line route extension to Krung Thonburi Station (S07) and Wongwian Yai Station (S08). Construction began on 13 December 2005 with completion originally expected within two years for a late 2007 opening. However, problems with the tendering and installation of a new Bombardier open signalling system repeatedly pushed back the schedule. The extension finally opening on 15 May 2009. However, the single platform Saphan Taksin station which has only one track, has caused repeated delays during rush hour. In 2012, the BMA announced plans to demolish Saphan Taksin station in the future. There are now plans to construct new platforms and remove the bottleneck and keep the station which provides an important link between river boats. The plan includes redesigning the road bridges either side of the viaduct to fit the new station.

2nd extension to Bang Wa
The third extension to the network, a 5.3 km, four station extension from Wongwian Yai (S8) to Bang Wa (S12) in Phasi Charoen District began construction in the 2nd quarter of 2011 with a deadline of the end of 2012. Only the stations had to be constructed as the viaduct had been completed some years prior. However, construction was delayed for many months by the Bangkok floods of late 2011. It eventually opened in stages. Pho Nimit opened on 12 January 2013, Talat Phlu opened on 14 February 2013, with the last two stations opening on 5 December 2013. The extension was initially operated by a separate 6 car shuttle service due to the absence of a turnout between Wongwian Yai (S8) and Talat Phlu (S10). The remaining two stations Wutthakat (S11) and Bang Wa (S12) were opened on 5 December 2013.

Saint Louis (S4) station – Silom Line 
In 2018, it was decided to finally build the missing Saint Louis (S4) station (originally named Sueksa Wittaya), the EIA was finalised in March 2019. Construction of the station began in August 2019 and by the end of 2019 had reached 25% progress. By August 2020, construction had reached 50% but was 30% behind schedule due to COVID related delays.

The station was opened on 8 February 2021.

Future extension plans

South: Bang Wa to Taling Chan
After the opening of Wutthakat (S11) and Bang Wa (S12) stations 5 December 2013, the BMA announced a new proposal to further extended the Silom line by 7 km from Bang Wa (S12) station, by six stations to Taling Chan. At Taling Chan it would connect with the SRT Light Red line.

A public hearing was held in 2015. Three route options were considered, with construction intended to start in 2017. Part of the basis for this further extension by the BMA is that it would provide proximate access to the Southern Bus Terminal. The BMA Transport and Traffic Office completed an economic evaluation of the extension in October 2018 which found a cost benefit ratio of 2.37. The study recommended that an EIA be completed in 2019 but this was delayed.

Once the extension to Taling Chan is built the BMA has canvassed the possibility of a further future extension north to connect with the MRT Purple Line at Rattanatibet Road.

West: Nat. Stadium to Yot Se
The BTS Silom line is planned to be extended by two stations west from National Stadium (W1) to link with the SRT Dark Red line at Yot Se station. However, no time frame for this extension has been announced and this section of the SRT Dark Red Line will not be built until after 2022.

Originally, the plan was to extend the Silom line west from National Stadium into Chinatown, then north to Democracy Monument where it would then run west to Rattanakosin Island and Sanam Luang, tunnel under the river to the Thonburi side before terminating at Phrannok. However, this plan was shelved back in 2009 and much of this route has been replaced by alignment changes to the MRT Orange line which is under construction.

Stations

References

External links
 Airport Rail Link, BTS, MRT & BRT network map

See also
 Mass Rapid Transit Master Plan in Bangkok Metropolitan Region
 BTS Skytrain
 Sukhumvit Line
 Bangkok Metro
 MRT Blue Line
 MRT Brown Line
 MRT Grey Line
 MRT Light Blue Line
 MRT Orange Line
 MRT Pink Line
 MRT Yellow Line
 Airport Rail Link (Bangkok)
 SRT Light Red Line
 SRT Dark Red Line
 BMA Gold Line
 Bangkok BRT

BTS Skytrain lines
Railway lines opened in 1999
1999 establishments in Thailand